Agios Georgios is a former municipality in the Thessaloniki regional unit, Greece. Since the 2011 local government reform it is part of the municipality Volvi, of which it is a municipal unit. Population 5,717 (2011). The municipal unit has an area of 65.866 km2.
The seat of the municipality was in Asprovalta.

References

Populated places in Thessaloniki (regional unit)